The 1958 Tulane Green Wave football team was an American football team that represented Tulane University during the 1958 NCAA University Division football season as a member of the Southeastern Conference. In their fifth year under head coach Andy Pilney, the team compiled a 3–7 record.

Tulane's last win of the season was vs. Alabama, playing its first season under coach Bear Bryant. It remains the Green Wave's last victory vs. the Crimson Tide.

Schedule

References

Tulane
Tulane Green Wave football seasons
Tulane Green Wave football